Jack Russell (born 1950) is an Irish retired hurler who played as a full-back for the Wexford senior team.

Born in New Ross, County Wexford, Russell first arrived on the inter-county scene at the age of seventeen when he first linked up with the Wexford minor team, before later joining the under-21 side. He joined the senior panel during the 1970 championship. Russell went on to play a bit part for the team for over a decade, and won two Leinster medals as a non-playing substitute. He was an All-Ireland runner-up on two occasions.

At club level Russell enjoyed a lengthy career with Geraldine O'Hanrahan's.

Throughout his inter-county career Russell made 7 championship appearances for Wexford. His retirement came following the conclusion of the 1983 championship.

Honours

Team

Wexford
Leinster Senior Hurling Championship (2): 1976 (sub), 1977 (sub)
Leinster Under-21 Hurling Championship (3): 1969, 1970, 1971
All-Ireland Minor Hurling Championship (1): 1968
Leinster Minor Hurling Championship (1): 1968

References

1950 births
Living people
Geraldine O'Hanrahan's hurlers
Wexford inter-county hurlers